The United Kingdom competed at the Junior Eurovision Song Contest 2004, where they were represented by Cory Spedding with the song "The Best Is Yet To Come".

Before Junior Eurovision

National final 
A national final was held by Independent Television (ITV) to select the UK entry for the Junior Eurovision Song Contest 2004. The final, broadcast on digital channel ITV2, was held on 4 September 2004 at the Granada Studios in Manchester and was presented by Holly Willoughby, Stephen Mulhern and Michael Underwood. Regional televoting was held to select the winner from the eight competing acts.

At Junior Eurovision
The 2004 Eurovision Song Contest was initially to be held in Manchester. However, ITV abandoned the project due to finance and scheduling problems. It was therefore moved to Lillehammer in Norway.

On the night of the contest, Cory Spedding performed 13th in the running order of the contest, following Latvia and preceding Denmark. At the close of the voting Cory received 140 points, placing 2nd of the 18 competing entries, beaten by María Isabel of Spain.

In the United Kingdom, the show was televised on digital channel ITV2 (due to poor viewing figures the previous year) with commentary by Matt Brown. The British spokesperson, who announced the British votes during the final, was national finalist Charlie Allan. A delayed broadcast, consisting of highlights, was aired on ITV1 the following afternoon.

Voting

References

United Kingdom
2004
Junior Eurovision Song Contest